Surprise (or, rarely, surprize) may refer to:

 Surprise (emotion), a brief emotional state experienced as the result of an unexpected significant event

Places
 Surprise, Arizona, a city in the United States
 Surprise, Indiana, an unincorporated community in the United States
 Surprise, Nebraska, a village in the United States
 Surprise, New York, a populated place in the United States
 Surprise Valley (disambiguation)

Arts and entertainment
 The Surprise (Watteau), a c. 1718 painting by Antoine Watteau

Film and television
 Surprise (1991 film), a short by Pixar
 Surprise! (film), a 1995 short by Veit Helmer
 Surprise (2015 film), a Chinese film directed by Show Joy
 The Surprise (film), a Dutch film directed by Mike van Diem 
 "Surprise" (Buffy the Vampire Slayer), a television episode
 "Surprise!" (Dexter's Laboratory), a television episode
 "Surprise" (The 7D), a television episode
 "Surprise" (Space Ghost Coast to Coast), an episode of Space Ghost Coast to Coast
 "Surprise", an episode of Zoey 101
 "Surprise!", an episode of Dora the Explorer
 "Surprise!", an episode of Arthur
 ¡Sorpresa!, a TV network whose name means "Surprise!" in Spanish

Music
 5urprise, a South Korean band
 Surprise Records, a record label
 Surprise Symphony, nickname of Symphony No. 94 (Haydn)

Albums
 Surprise (Crystal Waters album), 1991
 Surprise (Lynsey de Paul album), 1973
 Surprise (Paul Simon album), 2006
 Surprise (S.E.S. album), 2001
 Surprise (Sylvia album), 1984
 Surprises (Herbie Mann album), 1976
 Surprise, by Better Than Ezra, 1990
 Surprise!, by Fifteen, 1996

Songs
 "Surprise" (song), a 2022 song by Chloe Bailey
 "Surprise!" (song), a 1996 song by Bonnie Pink
 "Surprise", by HALO, 2015
 "Surprise", by James from the album Millionaires, 1999
 "Surprise", by Jolin Tsai from the album Lucky Number, 2001
 "Surprise", by Sugababes from the album Change, 2007
 "Surprise", by Gnarls Barkley from the album The Odd Couple, 2008
 "Surprises", by Billy Joel from the album The Nylon Curtain, 1982
 "Surprise", by Jars of Clay from the album Good Monsters, 2006

Boats
Surprise 15, an American sailboat design
Surprise 25, a French sailboat design

Ships
 HMS Surprise (includes HMS Surprize), the name of several British Royal Navy ships; also, 
HMS Surprise (replica ship), a modern tall ship, built at Lunenberg, Nova Scotia, Canada
 HMS Surprise (novel), a 1973 historical naval novel by Patrick O'Brian
 USS Surprise, the name of several United States Navy ships
 Surprise (1777 ship), the first American naval ship of the name
 , a British East India Company merchant ship 
 , a schooner launched in the U.S. that captured more than 30 British vessels before wrecking in 1815
 Surprise (paddle steamer), built 1831, the first steam powered vessel built and run in Australia
 Surprise (clipper), an 1850 clipper ship in the San Francisco and tea trades
 Surprise, a Sydney schooner that took London Missionary Society missionaries to Torres Strait Islanders in 1871
 Surprise (schooner), built in 1917-18 and still providing daily cruises for tourists on Penobscot Bay
 Royal Escape (1660 ship), the ex-collier Surprise

Other uses
 Surprise (apple), a pink-fleshed apple
 Surprise Moriri (born 1980), South African footballer

See also

 Surprise factor, a storytelling technique
 Self-information, a concept in information theory
 Surprise, Surprise (disambiguation)
 Shock (disambiguation)